Who the Hell Is Hamish? was an Australian crime podcast by The Australian newspaper reporting on the exploits of serial conman Hamish McLaren. It was hosted by Greg Bearup.

Background 
Hamish McLaren, born Hamish Watson on 29 March 1970, was a confidence trickster who used several aliases (including Hamish Earle McLaren, Hamish Phillip McLaren, Hamish Watson, Hamish Philip Watson, Hamish Maxwell, and Max Tavita). Between 2011-2017, while living in Bondi, he stole at least $7.66 million from 15 known victims in Australia (including one he married, and fashion designer Lisa Ho).  Overall, his known crimes (in the US, Canada, UK, Hong Kong, and Australia) netted him more than $70 million given that:Over three decades and four continents, he stole millions of dollars from the vulnerable and the naïve, using romance, lies and multiple identities to tear lives apart.

McLaren, though investigated and sued numerous times previously, was bankrupted in 2016, and was finally arrested in Australia in July 2017. He pleaded guilty in June 2019 “to 17 counts of dishonestly obtaining financial advantage by deception and one count of knowingly dealing with the proceeds of crime”. He was sentenced to 16 years (back dated to commence in mid-2017). He will be due for parole in 2029.

Episodes 
 The Day Max Died - details his arrest in 2017
 Fashion Crimes - introduces his dealings with Lisa Ho
 The Gatsby of the Great Lakes - covers his time as a jet setter in Canada
 The Intern - explains his relationship with his stepson’s 16 year-old girlfriend
 Who the Hell is Phil? - covers his day trading and the killing of his fictional twin brother
 Kevin from Queensland goes to Canada - from a man who knew him as a ski instructor in both countries
 On the Couch with Hamish - interviews with ex-girlfriends, including a professional assessment of him as a sociopath
 The Definition of Evil - highlighting the institutional failures in different countries in preventing his crime spree
 The Reckoning - recorded post-sentencing
The title of the series comes from McLaren’s then girlfriend reacting to his arrest. At the time, she knew him as Max Tavita and, after receiving a text message from “Hamish’s brother-in-law”, stated “Who the fuck is Hamish?”

Reception 
The investigative podcast was a popular success both in Australia and abroad. It peaked at #1 on the iTunes charts in Australian and the UK and #3 in the US and Canada. It spent a continuous 94 days in the top ten in Australia, 34 of which it was #1.

The podcast was a podcast pick of the week by The Guardian, writing "It's incredible to hear how much trust people put in him, but easy to see how they fell for the ruse." The Sydney Morning Herald called it a "Blue Velvet journey into Australian suburbia." It was featured as a favourite true crime podcast of the week by New York magazine.

References

External links 
 

2019 podcast debuts
2019 podcast endings
Audio podcasts
Australian podcasts
Australian crime podcasts
Investigative journalism
2010s in Australia